Jennifer Judith Jones OM (born July 7, 1974) is a Canadian curler. She was the Olympic champion in curling as skip of the Canadian team at the 2014 Sochi Games. Jones is the first female skip to go through the Games undefeated. The only male skip to achieve this was fellow Canadian Kevin Martin in 2010. Jones and her squad were the first Manitoba based curling team to win an Olympic gold medal. They won the 2008 World Women's Curling Championship and were the last Canadian women's team to do so until Rachel Homan in 2017. She won a second world championship in 2018. Jones represented Canada at the 2022 Winter Olympics.

Jones has won the national championship a record tying six times, most recently during the 2018 Scotties Tournament of Hearts, equalling Colleen Jones for total Scotties championships. To go along with her national championships, Jones has also won the Manitoba provincial championship 11 times, with a total of 16 Tournament of Heart appearances as of 2021, and has won more games at the Tournament of Hearts than any other curler. In addition to her accomplishments internationally, nationally, and provincially, she has also won 15 Grand Slam of Curling events on the World Curling Tour, more than any other female skip.

In 2019, Jones was named the greatest Canadian female skip and overall curler in history in a TSN poll of broadcasters, reporters and top curlers.

Early life and personal
Jennifer Judith Jones was born to Larry and Carol Jones, who were both curlers. She also has a sister named Heather 18 months older. During her childhood, she was often described as "shy". Larry Jones started teaching Jones when she was 11, although Jones' interest in the sport took up before that, in a daycare at the St. Vital Curling Club. She attended General Vanier School in South Winnipeg from kindergarten to grade 8. After, she attended Windsor Park Collegiate. At that point, Jones was proficient at volleyball and curling. "When I was in high school, I really had to make a choice, and it was actually my volleyball coach who told me I had to choose either volleyball or curling, and I chose curling," she told the CBC. She attended the University of Manitoba from 1999 to 2001.

At the University of Manitoba, she earned a B.A. in psychology and economics and a LL.B. She later became a lawyer, a corporate counsel for National Bank Financial, where she is now a senior legal advisor. Jones is married to former world champion curler Brent Laing from Ontario; they have two daughters. Their first daughter Isabella was born prematurely on 13 November 2012 in Barrie, Ontario. Although it was a premature birth, the baby was healthy, weighing over 3.2 kilograms. "Honestly, she's the best thing that's ever happened to me," she said. Their second daughter Skyla Carol was born on 18 August 2016. In late 2016 Jones moved to Shanty Bay, near Barrie, Ontario, with her husband, Brent Laing and daughters. A residency policy change adopted by Curling Canada in 2015 allows one team member to live out-of-province and continue to represent the province.

In addition to her job as a lawyer, Jones is also a motivational speaker.

Curling career

Juniors
Jones began curling at the age of 11. Jones won three provincial junior championships and a national junior championship as a junior curler. Her first provincial junior competition was in 1990 when she was 15. Jones' dad coached the team, including her sister Heather at second, Tracey Lavery at third, and Dana Malanchuk at lead. They won one time and lost two times before being eliminated. After the tournament, Jones was recruited to play third for Jill Staub.

In 1991, Jones won her first provincial junior title, playing third for Jill Staub (Thurston). The team also included Kristie Moroz at second and Kelly Scott (then Mackenzie) at lead. The team represented Manitoba at the 1991 Canadian Junior Curling Championships in Leduc, Alberta. The team finished the round-robin in first place with a 10–1 record. This gave the team a bye to the final, when they lost in the final to New Brunswick, skipped by Heather Smith.

After the loss, Jones set out to skipping her own team and form together the right squad. She approached Jill Officer, in whom she saw great potential at the Highlander Curling Club in Winnipeg."We got together when we were quite young and had an instant connection on the ice and became really good friends." says Jones.

Jones won her second provincial junior title in 1993 as a skip. Her team consisted of Trisha Baldwin at third, Jill Officer at second, and Dana Malanchuk (Allerton) at lead. After they won the provincial juniors, they set out for the Canadian Juniors. The team finished the round robin of the 1993 Canadian Juniors with an 8–3 record, tied for third with Nova Scotia and Quebec. The team played Quebec (skipped by Janique Berthelot) in their tie-breaker match but lost, eliminating them from the tournament.

The following year, the team won their second straight provincial junior title. At the 1994 Canadian Juniors, the team once again found themselves in a three-way tie for third, this time with Ontario and Northern Ontario, and with a 7–4 record.  In their first tie-breaker, they defeated Northern Ontario's Rhonda Halvorsen 10–4. They then defeated Ontario's Dominique Lascelles 10–8 in the second tie-breaker. This put the team into the semi-final against British Columbia's Jeanna Richard (Schraeder), whom they beat 5–3. The win put them in the final against the first place Saskatchewan rink, skipped by Sherry Linton. The team beat Saskatchewan 8–5, claiming the 1994 Canadian Junior title. However, during the final, Jones suffered a black eye and bumped her head after tripping over her feet. Jones told the CBC, "[My eye] is really sore, and I've got the biggest headache of my life." Ordinarily, this would mean a berth in the following year's World Junior Curling Championships, but a change in the ruling by the Canadian Curling Association (CCA) forced her to play in a playoff the following year at the 1995 Canadian Juniors for the right to attend, which she lost to MacKenzie's team. However, the CCA decided to give Jones' team another chance to qualify and put them directly at the semifinals, which was against MacKenzie and lost again. Jones had also lost to MacKenzie in the Manitoba Junior final that year.

Early women's career
After juniors, Jones would later partner up with Karen Porritt, Porritt's twin sister Lynn Fallis-Kurz, and Jones' junior lead, Dana Allerton. The team would lose in the final of the 2001 Manitoba Scott Tournament of Hearts, the provincial women's championship to Karen Young. However, the following year, the Jones rink won the Manitoba Hearts, which earned them the right to represent the province at the  2002 Scott Tournament of Hearts, the Canadian national women's championship. At the 2002 Hearts, she led her Manitoba rink to an 8–3 round robin finish, which placed them in third place. This placement put them in the playoffs, where she lost to Ontario's Sherry Middaugh. The following season, Jones replaced Porritt with Kimberly Keizer at third. The team made it to the final of the 2003 Manitoba Scott Tournament of Hearts but lost to Barb Spencer in the final.

Porritt was brought back onto the team the following season, replacing Keizer. The team had less success at the 2004 Manitoba Scott Tournament of Hearts, losing in the quarter-final to Joelle Duguid.

2005 and "The Shot"

Jones returned to the Scott at the 2005 Scott Tournament of Hearts, with her team consisting of Cathy Gauthier at lead, Jill Officer at second, and Cathy Overton-Clapham at third. She would win the 2005 Scotts by defeating Team Ontario, skipped by Jenn Hanna in the championship game. Jones faced an extremely difficult shot to win, having to hit a rock outside of the house and roll to the button, taking out an Ontario rock. She would have lost both the game and the tournament if she had missed.  The shot was perfect, scoring 4 points with her final stone and winning the game. CBC analyst Mike Harris described it as "the best shot I've ever seen to win a game". Revered by Canadian sports media and admiring curling fans, Jones' accomplishment under pressure was quickly dubbed "The Shot" and, in the following weeks, became the source of talk and attempts by novice curlers to repeat the feat in curling clubs across the country.  The team's win qualified them for the 2005 World Women's Curling Championship in Paisley, Scotland. The Worlds were a disappointing tournament for her and her team, where they constantly struggled with poor ice conditions. They were knocked out of the playoffs in the 3–4 game against Dordi Nordby and her Norway rink.

Team changes
In the off-season, Jones replaced Gauthier at lead with 2002 Olympic bronze medallist Georgina Wheatcroft, who had also won the 2000 World Championship. This was done partly to boost the team's chances at the Olympic trials in December 2005, the first time Jones had qualified for an Olympic Trial. However, the team finished a disappointing 5–4 out of the playoffs. In the trials, Jones also experienced a case of kidney stones and was rushed to hospital. She described it as "the worst pain I've ever had".

Because Jones had won the 2005 Scott Tournament of Hearts, she got to return to the 2006 Scott Tournament of Hearts in London, Ontario as Team Canada. At the Hearts that year, she managed to defeat Colleen Jones's team from Nova Scotia in the semi-final before losing to her former teammate Kelly Scott of Kelowna, British Columbia in the final.

In 2006, Wheatcroft moved back to her home of Vancouver, British Columbia, to live with the rest of her family and to play with her former skip, Kelley Law. She was replaced by Dana Allerton. Midway through the season, however, she was dropped in favour of Janet Arnott just before the provincial playdowns.

On the eve of the 2007 provincial championship, Jones decided Allerton wasn't working out and replaced her with the team's fifth player/coach Janet Arnott. Jones won another provincial championship in 2007, earning her a berth at the 2007 Scotties Tournament of Hearts. Jones made the playoffs again but lost to Kelly Scott again, this time in the semi-final. During the off-season, Jones switched leads again, gaining Dawn Askin, who had moved from Ottawa looking for a team from Jenn Hanna's rink. Jones won her first Canada Cup of Curling on 17 March 2007 with three wins and two losses.

After a bittersweet 2009/2010 curling season in which Jennifer Jones' rink won the 2010 Scotties Tournament of Hearts. They went 8–3 in the round robin and won the Page Playoff game 8–5 against Kathy O'Rouke of Prince Edward Island, which took them to the finals. Erin Carmody's team managed to tie the game. Jones then knocked the opposing team's stone out of the four-foot and won her third consecutive Canadian Championships. They also took bronze in the 2010 Ford World Women's Curling Championship, and lost out in the 2010 Players' Championships, the team decided to replace third Cathy Overton-Clapham, replacing her with the younger Kaitlyn Lawes in time for the 2010/2011 curling season.

World Championship success
In the 2007/2008 curling season, Jones celebrated several successes, including winning the 2007 Autumn Gold Grand Slam as well as the 2008 Manitoba Provincial Championship. Winning the 2008 Manitoba Provincial Championship qualified her to represent the province at the 2008 Scotties Tournament of Hearts in Regina, Saskatchewan. Jones got off to a slow start, having just a 3–4 record to start the week, but then got four consecutive wins for a 7–4 record, which earned a spot in the tiebreaker match where she defeated Newfoundland and Labrador's Heather Strong by a score of 6–3. In the first playoff game, Jones edged Québec skip Marie-France Larouche with a score of 6–5. She advanced to the semi-finals, where she defeated Ontario's Sherry Middaugh 9–8 by stealing a point in the extra end. In the final, Jones faced Alberta's Shannon Kleibrink. In the final stone, Kleibrink had the opportunity to score a big end for the win but only managed to knock out one Manitoba Stone, giving Jones' team a 6–4 victory and was crowned Canadian Champions for the second time.

Because of the win at the Canadian Championships, Jones got to compete at the 2008 World Women's Curling Championship in Vernon, British Columbia. This time, they had access to the top coaches, athletic therapists and sports psychologists like Dr. Cal Botterill. During the round robin, Canada was defeated by Wang Bingyu of China. They were down 6–1 in four ends to Debbie McCormick of America when coach Janet Arnott delivered a speech. TSN analyst Cathy Gauthier said, "I heard Janet say something once, and it really struck in my head". The Canadians made a comeback, winning 10–9 and every game after that except to Angelina Jensen from Denmark, which they lost 6–3. They also lost to China again. After a comeback, Jones made it into the finals and defeated China to capture her first World Championship by a score of 7–4. Jones finished the week with an overall record of 11–3.

Repeat championships
In 2009, Jennifer Jones and her team competed at the 2009 Tournament of Hearts. They went on a record of 7–4, which led to a tiebreaker match against Rebecca Jean MacPhee of Prince Edward Island. They found themselves losing 3–0 but won 6–5. They beat Quebec's Marie-France 12–8 in the semi-finals and beat Marla Mallett from British Columbia to 8–5 to win her second consecutive title. The win at the Scotties sent the Jones rink back to the World Championship. But as in 2005, the outcome was disappointing. Jones was defeated in the bronze medal game by Angelina Jensen from Denmark. She ended the season by winning her third Players' Championship.

Jones participated in the 2009 Canadian Olympic Curling Trials in mid-December, there the team played a 2–5 record and ended up tied for sixth place and off of the playoffs. She later revealed that she was sick all week and unable to play well. "We worked really, really hard and wanted to excel at this event, but it just didn't work out," Jones told reporters.

Jennifer Jones and team again returned to the Scotties as defending champions, Team Canada. In the round robin, the team managed to finish tied for first but second overall to upstart PEI with an 8–3 record. The page 1 vs 2 playoff featured PEI facing Jennifer Jones, which saw Jones winning and through to the final. PEI would beat Ontario in the semifinal to force a rematch of the 1 vs 2 page playoff. In the finals, PEI was winning 6–3 through 6 ends. Jones stole a point in the eighth and two more in the ninth to make it 7–6 for Team Canada. P.E.I tied the game with a single point in the tenth, forcing an 11th end. Finally, Jones picked a yellow P.E.I stone out of the four-foot in the extra end to win the tournament, completing another Scotties comeback and securing her 3rd consecutive Tournament of Hearts victory and 4th STOH victory in total. "It's pretty incredible and the way we won, the way we came back," said Jones.

Jones third win in a row put her in the elite company of Vera Pezer and Colleen Jones (no relation to Jennifer) as the only skips to have won three Tournament of Hearts in a row. As this was also her 4th win in total, she and second Jill Officer became part of a group of 4 to have won 4 Scotties; they joined Vera Pezer and Lee Morrison of Saskatoon. The win was Cathy Overton-Clapham's 5th in total this moved her one off Colleen Jones in the record book and alongside the legendary Joyce McKee of Saskatchewan and Nova Scotians Mary Anne Arsenault, Nancy Delahunt and Kim Kelly.

At the 2010 Ford World Women's Curling Championship, after finishing the round robin with a 10–1 record, she lost all her playoff games except the bronze medal final against Sweden. Jones claimed her second world championship medal in four tries with that bronze.

Jones won her second Canada cup title in 2011, defeating Chelsea Carey in the final.

At the 2013 Tournament of Hearts, where her Manitoba rink finished second, Jones became the second Canadian woman to record 100 wins as a skip at the Canadian championships.

2013–14
Jones competed at the 2013 Canadian Olympic Curling Trials, where she managed to qualify as the top seed through the round robin play, which meant the team went directly to the finals. There she defeated Sherry Middaugh eight to four and won the right to represent Canada at the Olympics for the first time.  She skipped the Canadian women's team to a gold medal at the 2014 Winter Olympics.  Jones is the first-ever female skip in Olympic history to be undefeated throughout the tournament. The only male skip to achieve it was fellow Canadian Kevin Martin in 2010. After the win, she said that "We're Olympic gold medallists. It's something that you dream of for your entire life. It's what every athlete wants to do, and we did it today. And we did it in a way where we played so consistent all week. On the biggest stage for sport, we came out and played our best. And I'm so so proud of us." On the World Curling Tour that season, the Jones team won 3 slams, the 2013 Manitoba Liquor & Lotteries Women's Classic, the 2013 Colonial Square Ladies Classic and the season-ending 2014 Players' Championship.

2014–15
Jones began the 2014–15 curling season by winning the 2014 Curlers Corner Autumn Gold Curling Classic grand slam event. Later, Jones went undefeated in the 2015 Manitoba Scotties Tournament of Hearts and represented Manitoba in the 2015 Scotties Tournament of Hearts, which she won. She went on to represent Canada at the 2015 World Women's Curling Championship, where she won a silver medal after losing to Alina Pätz in the final.

2015–16
As defending champions, the Jones rink would represent Team Canada at the 2016 Scotties Tournament of Hearts. The team finished the round robin with a 9–2 record, in a tie for first place. In the playoffs, however, they lost both of their games before rebounding in the bronze medal game, defeating Team Manitoba's Kerri Einarson rink. In the very last slam of the year, the inaugural 2016 Humpty's Champions Cup, Team Jones defeated Rachel Homan to win her lone slam of the season.

2016–17
Early on in the 2016–17 curling season, Jones defeated Homan to win the 2016 Canada Cup of Curling, Jones' third career title. The Jones rink lost in the semifinal of the 2017 Manitoba Scotties Tournament of Hearts, marking the first time since 2004 that the team did not win the event (having also participated). Team Jones won one slam that season, the 2017 Players' Championship, where they beat Valerie Sweeting's team in the final.

2017–18
With the 2017 Canadian Olympic Curling Trials approaching, Jones was attempting to repeat as the Canadian Olympic team and Olympic champion. The team did not play as well as expected and eventually lost in the semi-final and were unable to qualify. During the mixed doubles Olympic trials, third, Kaitlyn Lawes would win with teammate John Morris. During the 2018 Manitoba Scotties Tournament of Hearts taking place in Killarney, Manitoba, the team played very well. Facing Darcy Robertson, the team scored two in the final to win their 8th provincial title. The team would go on to play in the 2018 Scotties Tournament of Hearts in Penticton, British Columbia, but Lawes was unavailable due to her participation in mixed doubles at the 2018 Winter Olympics. So the upcoming Shannon Birchard took her spot at the third position while Lawes was named as the team's alternate, despite her presence in Korea. In the national event, the team continued their exceptional performance; they beat the Wildcard team from Manitoba, Kerri Einarson in the 1v2 page playoff game and would face her again in the final, where they would win over the team for the second time in a row.

Following her return from South Korea, Lawes joined the Jones team and took her spot at third back from Birchard. The team's victory in Penticton meant they won the right to wear the maple leaf at the 2018 Ford World Women's Curling Championship taking place in North Bay, Ontario. The team played very well and went through the round-robin undefeated. They would eventually beat Jamie Sinclair and her American team in the semi-final earning the right to face the Olympic champion, Anna Hasselborg of Sweden, in the final. Lawes and the Jones team would have to take Hasselborg to an extra end but ultimately won the game without having to throw their last rock. The victory was Lawes' first World Championship victory and would be the last for long-time second Jill Officer, as she announced she was stepping back from the game. Jones, with tears in her eyes, said of the final game with Officer that "I'm just so thrilled to be able to stand on top of the podium with these girls one more time." It had earlier been announced that Jocelyn Peterman would be joining the team the following season, coming over from the Chelsea Carey team to replace Officer.

On the tour that season, the Jones rink won two slams, the 2017 Masters of Curling and the 2017 Boost National, beating Kerri Einarson and Casey Scheidegger, respectively.

2018–19
Jones won her fourth career Canada Cup title in 2018, defeating Kerri Einarson in the final. In the new year, she won the 2019 TSN All-Star Curling Skins Game, defeating Tracy Fleury's rink to pick up $51,000. Her rink represented Team Canada as defending champions at the 2019 Scotties Tournament of Hearts. The team struggled, finishing the round robin with a 6–5 record and missing the playoffs. It was the first time Jones had ever missed the playoffs at the Scotties in her 14th event. Jones was invited to represent Team Canada (in lieu of a pregnant Rachel Homan, who had previously qualified) in the Grand Final of the inaugural Curling World Cup. Jones and her composite rink of Kaitlyn Lawes, Shannon Birchard and Jill Officer won the event, defeating the World Champion Silvana Tirinzoni rink from Switzerland in the final.

2019–20
In their first event of the 2019–20 season, Team Jones won the 2019 AMJ Campbell Shorty Jenkins Classic, defeating Tracy Fleury in the final. Next, they played in the 2019 Colonial Square Ladies Classic, where Fleury would take them out in the semi-finals. They had two quarterfinal finishes at the first two Slams of the season, the Masters and the Tour Challenge. The team struggled at the Canada Cup, finishing with a 2–4 record. The team made the final at the Boost National, losing to Team Hasselborg, and the quarterfinals at the Canadian Open. The team made the final of the 2020 Manitoba Scotties Tournament of Hearts and lost to Team Einarson. By virtue of their CTRS ranking, the team had a second chance to qualify for the 2020 Scotties Tournament of Hearts through the wild card play-in game, where they defeated Team Fleury to become Team Wild Card. At the Scotties, they finished the round robin and championship pool with a 9–2 record as the second seed in playoffs but lost to Kerri Einarson (Team Manitoba) in the 1 vs. 2 playoff game and to Rachel Homan (Team Ontario) in the semifinal to finish in third place. It would be their last event of the season as both the Players' Championship and the Champions Cup Grand Slam events were also cancelled due to the COVID-19 pandemic. On 18 March 2020, the team announced that Lisa Weagle, after parting ways with Team Homan, would join the team in a 5-player rotation.

2020–21
After losing in the semi-final of the 2020 Scotties, Jones did not "step foot (sic) on the ice" again until the 2020 Cameron's Brewing Mixed Doubles Cashspiel played in September 2020, due to the COVID pandemic. Jones and partner Brent Laing went undefeated at the event, defeating Maddy Warriner and Charlie Richard in the final. A week later, she won her first women's event of the season at the 2020 Stu Sells Oakville Tankard. The 2021 Manitoba Scotties were cancelled due to the COVID-19 pandemic in Manitoba, so Curl Manitoba appointed the Jones rink to represent Manitoba at the 2021 Scotties Tournament of Hearts. At the 2021 Hearts, Jones led Manitoba to a 9–3 record, putting them in a third place tiebreaker match against Alberta, skipped by Laura Walker. Walker defeated Jones 9–8 to advance to the semifinal. A month later, Jones was back in the bubble to compete with Brent Laing at the 2021 Canadian Mixed Doubles Curling Championship. After going 5–1 record through the round robin, the pair lost in the round of 8 to eventual champions Kerri Einarson and Brad Gushue, eliminating them from contention. Jones ended her season with her women's team at the only two Grand Slam events of the abbreviated season, also held in the Calgary bubble. Her team missed the playoffs at both the 2021 Champions Cup and the 2021 Players' Championship.

2021–22
Team Jones qualified for the playoffs in each of their first four tour events; however, they were not able to qualify for any finals. At the first Grand Slam of the season, the 2021 Masters, the team was able to reach the final before losing to Tracy Fleury in a 9–7 match. They then missed the playoffs at the 2021 National two weeks later.

A month later, Team Jones competed in the 2021 Canadian Olympic Curling Trials. There, the team posted a 5–3 round robin record, earning a spot in the semifinal. They then defeated Krista McCarville to qualify for the final, where they would face Fleury again. After a tight game all the way through, Team Fleury stole one in the ninth end to take a single-point lead. In the tenth end, Jones had an open hit-and-stick to win the game; however, her shooter rolled too far, and she only got one. This sent the game to an extra end. On her final shot, Fleury attempted a soft-weight hit on a Jones stone partially buried behind a guard. Her rock, however, curled too much and hit the guard, giving up a steal of one and the game to Team Jones. After the game, Jones said that "We're there to pick each other up when you miss, not everybody can say that and that's really a big strength of our team." With the win, Team Jones travelled to Beijing, China to represent Canada at the 2022 Winter Olympics. Jones, at 47, was the oldest Canadian athlete on the team for Games. Through the round robin, the Canadian team had mixed results, ultimately finishing tied for third with a 5–4 record. However, because of their draw shot challenge results, which were the lowest of the teams they were tied with, they ranked fifth overall, missing the playoffs. After their final game, an emotional Jones said, "I can tell everybody at home that we tried our very best, we're really sorry we don't get to play again, but we tried our hardest."

On March 15, 2022, Team Jones announced they would be parting ways after the 2021–22 season. Lead Dawn McEwen announced she would be retiring from competitive curling, while third Kaitlyn Lawes and second Jocelyn Peterman announced they would be joining Selena Njegovan and Kristin MacCuish of Team Fleury to form a new team. Additionally, alternate Lisa Weagle stated she would focus solely on mixed doubles. A few days later, on March 17, 2022, Jones announced that she would be teaming up with Team Mackenzie Zacharias for the 2022–23 season. Jones would take over the team as skip, with the four Zacharias members each moving down one position in the lineup.

Team Jones still had two more events together before parting ways, the 2022 Players' Championship and 2022 Champions Cup Grand Slams. At the Players', the team went 1–3, missing the playoffs. They then missed the playoffs again at the Champions Cup with a 1–4 record, ending the team's run together.

2022–23
Jones joined Team Zacharias for the 2022–23 curling season.

Grand Slam record
Jones has won a career 16 Grand Slam victories since the women's grand slam was introduced in 2006, more than any other female skip.

Former events

Teams

Honours

In 2011, she was a finalist for the Future Leaders of Manitoba award in the business/professional category. In 2014, she was made a member of the Order of Manitoba.

Notes

References

Bibliography

External links

 Team Jennifer Jones

1974 births
Living people
Canadian women curlers
Curlers from Winnipeg
Lawyers in Manitoba
World curling champions
Canadian women's curling champions
Curlers at the 2014 Winter Olympics
Olympic curlers of Canada
Olympic gold medalists for Canada
Olympic medalists in curling
Medalists at the 2014 Winter Olympics
Canadian women lawyers
Members of the Order of Manitoba
Continental Cup of Curling participants
Curlers from Simcoe County
Canada Cup (curling) participants
People from St. Vital, Winnipeg
Curlers at the 2022 Winter Olympics
University of Manitoba alumni